"Ava Adore" is a song by American alternative rock band the Smashing Pumpkins. It was the first single from their fourth album, Adore, and exhibited a new sound from the band which integrated traditional instruments with loops and electronic music. "Ava Adore" and the B-sides were written by Billy Corgan.

When released as a single in May 1998, "Ava Adore" reached number one in Iceland, number two in Greece, number five in New Zealand, and the top 20 in Australia, Canada, Hungary, Ireland, Norway, Sweden, and the United Kingdom. In the United States, it reached number 42 on the Billboard Hot 100, number three on the Modern Rock Tracks chart, and number eight on the Mainstream Rock chart.

Music video
The music video was released on June 1, 1998, and was directed by Dom and Nic, featuring the band in gothic-inspired clothing and walking through a variety of scenes. The video, filmed in one long take, is notable for its use of slow and fast motion while the speed of the camera is apparently static, and the band continues to lip sync to the song in perfect rhythm. The calculations required to work out the speed changes caused massive delays on set, causing the band to nearly call off the entire plan. The sets seen in the video were arranged in a configuration resembling a hallway, in which a rave sequence functioned as the end of the hall. Instead of continuing to the right, the camera rotates to the left, revealing the artifice of the visuals.

The music video won an award for "most stylish video" at the 1998 VH1 Fashion Awards.

Track listings
All songs written by Billy Corgan

Charts

Weekly charts

Year-end charts

Release history

References

External links
 

1998 songs
1998 singles
The Smashing Pumpkins songs
American synth-pop songs
Electronic rock songs
Hut Records singles
Number-one singles in Iceland
Song recordings produced by Billy Corgan
Song recordings produced by Flood (producer)
Songs written by Billy Corgan